The gilded barbet (Capito auratus) is a species of bird in the family Capitonidae, the New World barbets, and are close relatives of the toucans.

Description

It has a total length of c. 20 cm (8 in). As other New World barbets, the gilded barbet is a thickset, relatively large-headed bird with a stubby bill. The upperparts, tail, wings and mask are mainly black. The spotty bar over the greater wing coverts, narrow edging to the remiges and tips to the tertials are yellow. Additionally, the narrow yellow eyebrows extend as two parallel lines over the mantle. The belly is mainly pale yellow with black streaking to the flanks. Depending on subspecies, the throat ranges from red to orange, and the crown ranges from deep yellow over brownish-orange to reddish-orange. The female resembles the male, but with extensive orange-yellow edging to the wing-coverts, yellowish streaking to the auriculars and back, and the black streaking of the flanks also extending over the chest. In females from the westernmost part of its range (subspecies punctatus), the throat is streaked black. Both sexes have dark maroon irides, greyish legs and a broadly black-tipped grey bill.

Distribution and habitat
It is found in Bolivia, Brazil, Colombia, Ecuador, Peru, and Venezuela, in the Orinoco River Basin and western Amazon Basin. It was formerly considered a subspecies of the black-spotted barbet from north-eastern South America. Its natural habitats are tropical moist lowland forests and woodland. It mainly occurs in lowlands, but also ranges into the lower foothills of the eastern Andes. It is largely frugivorous.

Western Amazon Basin and Orinoco range
The gilded barbet ranges in the eastern Andes drainages to the rivers of the western Amazon Basin from eastern Colombia-Venezuela, eastern Ecuador, from north to south-eastern Peru, and northern Bolivia; in Bolivia the barbet only ranges on the headwater tributaries to the north-easterly flowing Madeira River. The eastern limit in the south-west Amazon Basin is the Purus River west of the Madeira.

In the north-west Amazon Basin, the eastern range limit is central Roraima state Brazil, the south flowing Branco River. The contiguous range to the north-west into Venezuela is all of eastern Venezuela approaching the Guyana border. The gilded barbet's range is on the eastern side of the Caribbean north-flowing Orinoco River drainage, but avoids the lower-half riverine strip by 150 km; the range occurs on the upper-half of the Orinoco River extending south into the eastern border area of Colombia.

A small range extension goes southeastwards into central Bolivia, which are also tributary areas to the Madeira River.

References

External links
Gilded Barbet photo gallery VIREO
Photo-Medium Res; Article birding-in-Peru–"Guilded Barbet"
Photo-High Res; Article greenbackedheron

gilded barbet
Birds of the Amazon Basin
Birds of the Colombian Amazon
Birds of the Venezuelan Amazon
Birds of the Ecuadorian Amazon
Birds of the Peruvian Amazon
Birds of the Bolivian Amazon
gilded barbet
gilded barbet
Taxonomy articles created by Polbot